Emiliekilde is a memorial located at the corner of Strandvejen and Emiliekildevej in Klampenborg, Gentofte Municipality, in the northern suburbs of Copenhagen, Denmark. It was installed by Ernst Heinrich von Schimmelmann to commemorate his first wife, Emilie Caroline, who had recently died of tuberculosis.

Description
The monument is 5.7 metres tall and built in reddish granite. A short flight of stairs leads up the monument, which is backed by a low wall. The wider base has an arched opening with a spring flowing from a small pipe. The monument is topped by a sandstone urn. Just below the urn is a white marble plaque with the name EMILIA'S KILDE ("Emily's Spring") in capital lettering. Further down on the monument is another white marble plaque with a short poem in carved lettering that has almost disappeared. It reads:

History

Count Ernst Heinrich von Schimmelmann married Emilie Caroline Rantzau at Ahrensburg in 1775. The couple lived in the Schimmelmann Mansion on Bredgade in Copenhagen but spent their summers at Sølyst in the countryside to the north of the city. On 6 February 1780, just 20 years old, Emilie died from tuberculosis. Shortly thereafter Schimmelmann commissioned a memorial from Nicolai Abildgaard to commemorate his departed wife. He married Caroline Schimmelmann in 1782. The memorial to his first wife was installed close to Sølyst that same year. The poem on the monument was written by Christen Henriksen Pram.

The monument became a popular destination for excursions during the Danish Golden Age. It is the subject of a number of paintings from the period.

References

External links

Listed buildings and structures in Gentofte Municipality
Springs of Denmark
Listed monuments and memorials in Copenhagen
Danish Golden Age